David Matthew Mirfin (born 18 April 1985) is an English retired professional footballer who played as a centre back.

Career

Huddersfield Town
Mirfin was born in Sheffield, South Yorkshire. He graduated from the Huddersfield Town Academy in the 2003–04 season and made an immediate impression, helping the team keep 16 clean sheets out of the 25 matches he appeared in that season and also scoring three goals as an emergency striker.

On 5 May 2007, Mirfin was voted the Player's Player of the Year, the Away Supporters' Top Performer and the Fans' Player of the Year. He also collected the Young Terriers Award and the Huddersfield Examiner Majority Man of the Match for the whole season.

During the 2007–08 season, Mirfin's chances seemed to be limited following a poor defensive partnership between him and Nathan Clarke, but following the arrival of Rob Page and the departure of manager Andy Ritchie, Mirfin found himself in a three-man central defence partnership with Page and Clarke, which after five matches kept four clean sheets.

Scunthorpe United and Watford
Mirfin signed for Huddersfield's League One rivals Scunthorpe United on 11 August 2008 on a three-year contract for a transfer fee of £150,000 plus add ons and a 25% sell-on clause. He made his debut on 16 August in a 2–1 away defeat to Walsall, but his debut lasted just 10 minutes, after he was sent off for a foul on Jabo Ibehre. His first goal for Scunthorpe came on 4 November in the Football League Trophy with a header in stoppage time in a 1–0 home over Rochdale, which put Scunthorpe into the northern area semi-final. Mirfin was released by the club at the end of the 2010–11 season when his contract expired.

Mirfin signed for Championship club Watford on 5 July 2011 on a two-year contract on a free transfer. He made his debut on 23 August in a 1–1 draw away to Bristol Rovers in the League Cup, with Watford losing 4–2 in the resulting penalty shoot-out.

Return to Scunthorpe United
Mirfin rejoined Scunthorpe United, now in League One, on 31 January 2012 on loan until the end of the 2011–12 season, playing 19 matches. He was released from his Watford contract by mutual consent on 31 July 2012 to re-sign for Scunthorpe permanently on a two-year contract.

Mirfin joined League Two club Hartlepool United on 2 February 2015 on a one-month loan.

Mansfield Town
Mirfin signed for League Two club Mansfield Town on 23 May 2017 on a contract of undisclosed length on a free transfer. He scored on his debut on 5 August in a 2–2 draw away to Crewe Alexandra with a shot at the far post from Joel Byrom's free kick.

Mirfin joined National League North club York City on 1 February 2019 on loan until the end of the 2018–19 season. He made his debut the following day, starting in a 3–2 win away to Alfreton Town in the league.

In May 2019 it was confirmed, that Mirfin had decided to retire.

Career statistics

Honours

Club
Huddersfield Town
Football League Third Division play-offs: 2004

Scunthorpe United
Football League Trophy runner-up: 2008–09
Football League One play-offs: 2009
Football League Two runner-up: 2013–14

References

External links

1985 births
Living people
Footballers from Sheffield
English footballers
Association football defenders
Huddersfield Town A.F.C. players
Scunthorpe United F.C. players
Watford F.C. players
Hartlepool United F.C. players
Mansfield Town F.C. players
York City F.C. players
English Football League players
National League (English football) players